This is a list of women who are or have been members of the Scottish Parliament.

 List of female members of the Scottish Parliament

Notes

References

External links 
 Current and previous Members of the Scottish Parliament (MSPs), on the Scottish Parliament website

Women
Scottish Parliament